Denis Višinský (born 21 March 2003) is a Czech professional footballer who plays as a winger for SK Slavia Prague.

Career
Višinský is a youth product of Slavia Prague, having joined their youth academy at the age of 6. He signed his first professional contract with them in February 2021. Višinský made his professional debut with Slavia Prague in a 3–0 Czech First League win over FK Mladá Boleslav on 14 March 2021.

References

External links

Fotbal Profile

Slavia Profile
Slavia Profile
SN Profile

2003 births
Living people
People from Mělník
Czech footballers
Czech Republic youth international footballers
SK Slavia Prague players
Czech First League players
Association football wingers
Sportspeople from the Central Bohemian Region
FC Slovan Liberec players
FC Sellier & Bellot Vlašim players